Harry Cutler Blanchard (June 13, 1929, Burlington, Vermont – January 31, 1960, Buenos Aires, Argentina) was an American racecar driver.

His only Grand Prix appearance came at the wheel of a Porsche RSK Formula 2 car in the first US Grand Prix at Sebring in 1959. He finished seventh and last, four laps behind the winner Bruce McLaren. A few months later he died when his Porsche sportscar overturned during the 1000 km Buenos Aires race.

Complete Formula One results
(key)

1929 births
1960 deaths
Racing drivers from Vermont
American Formula One drivers
Sportspeople from Burlington, Vermont
Racing drivers who died while racing
Sport deaths in Argentina
World Sportscar Championship drivers